Phragmataecia sumatrensis is a species of moth of the family Cossidae. It is found on Sumatra in Indonesia.

References

Moths described in 1892
Phragmataecia